Aristotle is a 2007 book by Christopher Shields in which the author provides an introduction to Aristotle's thought. The book has been translated into Chinese, Turkish and Persian. The second edition of the book was published in 2014.

Reception
Barbara Sattler calls the book "a very readable and helpful guide to Aristotle".
Hamidreza Mahboobi Arani (from Tarbiat Modares University) won the Iranian Book Review Award for reviewing the book.

References 

2007 non-fiction books
English-language books
Works about Aristotle